The women's 400 metres hurdles competition at the 2012 Summer Olympics in London, United Kingdom was held at the Olympic Stadium on 5–8 August.

Summary
The opening round went largely to form, except 2012 world #7 Vania Stambolova took herself out crashing the first hurdle. Vera Barbosa set the national record for Portugal in advancing.

The first semi final loaded up Natalya Antyukh and Zuzana Hejnová who pushed each other to the finish and the top two qualifying times, plus taking T'erea Brown to the top time qualifier. In the second semi Lashinda Demus had a clear lead, slowing on the way home to just exert enough effort to finish first. The final semi was the slowest led by Muizat Ajoke Odumosu's Nigerian national record, Georganne Moline and Denisa Rosolova battled for second, with Rosolova taking the other time qualifier in the process.

In the final, Demus was first over the first two hurdles, then Antyukh steadily built her lead to a full stride at hurdle 9, with Demus the closest challenger. Antyukh stuttered the tenth hurdle, opening the door for Demus to chase her to the finish line, but Antyukh held on for gold, Demus disappointed with silver and Hejnová clearly in the bronze medal position.

Antyukh's time brought her to the number 6 athlete of all time, defeating Demus who already held number 3.

In 2020, Antyukh was among four Russian track and field athletes charged with doping offences, facing charges of using a prohibited substance or method. The Athletics Integrity Unit said the cases were based on an investigation into Russian doping for the World Anti-Doping Agency presented in 2016 by Canadian lawyer Richard McLaren. Her ban was confirmed on 7 April 2021 by the Court of Arbitration for Sport when she was banned from athletics for 4 years with all her results from 30 June 2013 onwards disqualified. Initially, her Olympic gold was not in danger. However, in October 2022, over 10 years and two months after the medals were awarded, her results from July 2012 to June 2013 were disqualified for a doping violation, stripping her of the gold medal. American silver medalist Lashinda Demus could potentially receive the gold medal, which was pending reallocation by the International Olympic Committee as of 24 October 2022. On 21 December 2022, World Athletics upgraded Demus to first place, while the IOC had not yet done so.

Competition format
The women's 400 m hurdles competition consisted of heats (Round 1), semifinals and a final. The fastest competitors from each race in the heats qualified for the semifinals along with the fastest overall competitors not already qualified that were required to fill the available spaces in the semifinals. 24 competitors qualified from the heats for the semifinals. A total of eight competitors qualified for the final from the semifinals.

Records
, the existing World and Olympic records were as follows.

Schedule
All times are British Summer Time (UTC+1)

Results

Heats

Qual. rule: first 4 of each heat (Q) plus the 4 fastest times (q) qualified.

Heat 1

Heat 2

Ghfran Almouhamad originally finished in eighth place with a time of 58.09, but was later disqualified for testing positive for methylhexaneamine.
Raasin McIntosh was originally disqualified for unknown reasons. It was later overturned.

Heat 3

Heat 4

Nagihan Karadere was disqualified for false starting.

Heat 5

Semifinals
Qual. rule: first 2 of each heat (Q) plus the 2 fastest times (q) qualified.

Heat 1

Lauren Boden was originally disqualified for unknown reasons, but it was later overturned.

Heat 2

Heat 3

Denisa Rosolová and Hanna Titimets were originally disqualified for unknown reasons, but they were overturned. Denisa Rosolová therefore qualified for the final.

Final

Perri Shakes-Drayton originally qualified for the final, but she was later taken out after Denisa Rosolová's disqualification was overturned.

References

Athletics at the 2012 Summer Olympics
400 metres hurdles at the Olympics
2012 in women's athletics
Women's events at the 2012 Summer Olympics